
Gmina Lubanie is a rural gmina (administrative district) in Włocławek County, Kuyavian-Pomeranian Voivodeship, in north-central Poland.

Villages
Gmina Lubanie contains the villages and settlements of Bodzia, Dąbrówka, Gąbinek, Janowice, Kałęczynek, Kaźmierzewo, Kocia Górka, Kolonia Ustrońska, Kucerz, Lubanie, Mikanowo A, Mikanowo B, Probostwo Dolne, Probostwo Górne, Przywieczerzyn, Przywieczerzynek, Sarnówka, Siutkówek, Tadzin, Ustronie, Włoszyca Lubańska, Zapomianowo and Zosin.

Neighbouring gminas
Gmina Lubanie is bordered by the city of Włocławek and by the gminas of Bądkowo, Bobrowniki, Brześć Kujawski and Waganiec.

References
Polish official population figures 2006

Lubanie
Włocławek County